The Serb National Council is an elected political, consulting and coordinating body which acts as a form of self-government and autonomous cultural institution of the Serbs of Croatia in matters regarding civil rights and cultural identity. The council's main focuses are human, civil and national rights, as well the issues of Serbs of Croatia identity, participation and integration in the Croatian society.

The body was established as the national coordination of Serb community in Croatia in 1997, in the aftermath of the Croatian War of Independence and defeat of the self-proclaimed Republic of Serbian Krajina. The legal basis for its establishment was extracted from the international Erdut Agreement signed in 1995 which ended the conflict in the Eastern Slavonia, Baranja and Western Syrmia by granting rights on cultural autonomy in exchange for peaceful reintegration. Serb National Council network consists of 94 regional and local (municipal or town) councils with the total of 1581 councilors. They are elected every four years at the National Minorities Councils and Representatives Elections with the most recent one being organized in 2019.

History

History of Serb Cultural Autonomy in Croatia

Contemporary Serb National Council postulate its cultural tradition in historical precedence of non-segregationist and non-territorial bodies of Serb cultural autonomy in the territory of modern day Croatia. Section Four (4) of the Article One (1) of the Statute of the Serb National Council explicitly enumerate following historical foundations of Serb cultural autonomy based on which the body function:
A) Historical documents issued by Emperors of the House of Habsburg in 1690, 1691, 1695, 1706, 1713, 1715, 1732 and 1743 and explicitly naming the 1779 Declaratory Rescript of the Illyrian Nation.
B) Austrian Empire and the Austro-Hungarian Empire legal articles of 1790, 1848 and 1868.
C) Franz Joseph I of Austria Rescript issued to the Patriarch of Karlovci Samuilo Maširević on 10 October 1868.
D) The Law of the 14 May 1887 and other acts related to Serb rights enacted by the Sabor (Parliament) of the Triune Kingdom of Croatia, Slavonia and Dalmatia.
E) 1918 document of the National Council of Slovenes, Croats and Serbs of the State of Slovenes, Croats and Serbs.
F) Documents of the State Anti-fascist Council for the National Liberation of Croatia affirming Serbs from Croatia, together with Croats, as equal constituents of the Council and its work which represent foundation of the post-World War II Croatian constitutional organization.

Dissolution of Yugoslavia

The first multi-party elections in the Socialist Republic of Croatia in 1990 took place during the political crisis within the Socialist Federal Republic of Yugoslavia, the disintegration of the League of Communists of Yugoslavia, and growing ethnic tensions between Croats and Serbs. Majority of Croatian Serbs voted for the reformed League of Communists of Croatia yet it surprisingly ended up only second in the elections. Significant part of the numerous Serb community in Croatia feared that the new government led by then nationalist Croatian Democratic Union may permit or initiate some of the oppressive policies experienced during the World War II Genocide of Serbs in the Independent State of Croatia. Those fears were instrumentalized to the advantage of nationalist Serb Democratic Party which established control over most of the Serb majority communities in an effort to complete ethnic separation. Nationalist Serb leadership goals was facilitated by the involvement of the Yugoslav People's Army, particularly in multicultural eastern parts of Slavonia (Podunavlje) which will form SAO Eastern Slavonia, region where Serbs were not majority and the Serb Democratic Party did not even exist at the time of 1990 elections.

On 8 December 1991 Serb Democratic Forum was established in Lipik (only two days after the government forces took control of the town) in an effort to prevent the further escalation of the Croatian War of Independence and to seek peaceful resolution of the conflict. At that time initial phase of the war was already finished which led to effective separation of Serbs and Croats. Serbs in areas controlled by the Croatian Government and Croats in Republic of Serbian Krajina were exposed to persecution and expulsion. In 1992 Serbs in the areas controlled by Croatian Government started their first initiatives to establish cultural coordination body. The group intended to establish the Serb National Sabor on the model of historical bodies existing in Austrian Empire from the 17th to the 19th century. The initiative was condemned by the members of Croatian Parliament and Croatian Government as an effort to create parallel Parliament of Croatia and the following negative media campaign accused the initiative of being more dangerous and perfidious than the separatist actions of Serbs in self-proclaimed Republic of Serbian Krajina. This led to the failure of the initiative and absence of any new initiative until the late 1995 and early 1996.

Erdut Agreement and the UNTAES transitional authority

Formation
The Serb National Council constituent assembly was held in 1997 in Zagreb at the incentive of the Alliance of Serbian Organizations and its members Prosvjeta, Serb Democratic Forum, Serb Community of Rijeka and Istria and the Joint Council of Municipalities of eastern Slavonia, Baranja and western Syrmia. In addition, founding members were also Independent Democratic Serb Party, Baranja Democratic Forum, Association of Serb Refugees and Expellees from Croatia, representatives of some church parishes of the Serbian Orthodox Church, members of Parliament of Serb ethnicity and respectable individuals.

Statute
The Serb National Council’s Statute consists of 29 articles. According to Statute Article 2, legal bases for establishment of Council are:
 provisions from Constitution of Croatia
 Croatian Constitutional law on national minorities rights
 International laws on human rights and freedoms and the rights of ethnic and national communities and minorities (United Nations Charter, Universal Declaration of Human Rights, International Covenant on Civil and Political Rights, International Covenant on Economic, Social and Cultural Rights, Helsinki Final Act, Paris Charter and other relevant OSCE documents, European Convention on Human Rights with protocols, International Convention on the Elimination of All Forms of Racial Discrimination, Genocide Convention, Convention on the Rights of the Child and other relevant Treaties signed by Croatia)

Structure

The Serb National Council structure consist of Assembly, Presidency, the Supervisory Board, president, deputy president and vice presidents. Permanent working bodies of Presidency are: 1) Committee for the selection, appointment and organization, 2) Committee for Human Rights in the constitutional and legal position of the Serbs, 3) Committee on education and youth, 4) Committee for return, reconstruction and socio-economic position of Serbs, 5) Committee on Information, publishing and documentation and 6) Committee for Cooperation with the Serbs in other countries.

Regional and local councils

Criticisms
The Council is the target of criticism from Croatian far-right parties and groups such as Croatian Party of Rights and Croatian Party of Rights dr. Ante Starčević.

In 2012, the Council was criticized by the Serbian Democratic Forum for alleged non-transparent and illegal management of funds allocated by the Croatian Government for the development and work of Serb organisations and institutions in Croatia.

Presidents 

 Milorad Pupovac (1997–2019)
 Boris Milošević (2019–2020)
 TBD

Other
There are other organisations in the ex-Yugoslav region with the same name, notably the Serbian National Council of Kosovo and Metohija (SNV KiM).

See also
 Tragovi: Journal for Serbian and Croatian Topics

References

External links
Official website

Human rights organizations based in Croatia
Serbian minority institutions and organizations in Croatia
1997 establishments in Croatia
Donji grad, Zagreb
Organizations based in Zagreb